Events from the year 1940 in the United States.

Incumbents

Federal Government 
 President: Franklin D. Roosevelt (D-New York)
 Vice President: John Nance Garner (D-Texas)
 Chief Justice: Charles Evans Hughes (New York)
 Speaker of the House of Representatives: William B. Bankhead (D-Alabama) (until September 15), Sam Rayburn (D-Texas) (starting September 16)
 Senate Majority Leader: Alben W. Barkley (D-Kentucky)
 Congress: 76th

Events

January–March
 February 7 – RKO release Walt Disney's second full-length animated film, Pinocchio.
 February 9 – Mae West and W. C. Fields join comedic forces for My Little Chickadee with tremendous success. The film becomes one of the highest-grossing of the year.
 February 10 – Tom and Jerry make their debut in Puss Gets the Boot.
 February 27 – Martin Kamen and Sam Ruben discover carbon-14.
 February 29 – The 12th Academy Awards, hosted by Bob Hope, are presented at the Ambassador Hotel in Los Angeles, with Victor Fleming's Gone with the Wind winning eight awards out of thirteen nominations, including Outstanding Production and Best Director for Fleming.
 March – Truth or Consequences debuts on NBC Radio.
 March 2 – Cartoon character Elmer Fudd makes his debut in the animated short Elmer's Candid Camera.
March 4 – Kings Canyon National Park is established in California.

April–June

 April – Dick Grayson (AKA as Robin, the Boy Wonder) first appears with Batman.
 April 1 (April Fools' Day) – Census date for the 16th U.S. Census.
 April 3 – Isle Royale National Park is established in Michigan.
 April 7 – Booker T. Washington becomes the first African American to be depicted on a United States postage stamp.
 April 12 – Opening day at Jamaica Racetrack features the use of pari-mutuel betting equipment, a departure from bookmaking heretofore used exclusively throughout New York state. Other NY tracks follow suit later in 1940.
 April 13 – New York Rangers win their Third Stanley Cup in ice hockey (and last until 1994) by defeating the Toronto Maple Leafs 4 games to 2.
 April 21 – Take It or Leave It makes it debut on CBS Radio, with Bob Hawk as host.
 April 23 – Rhythm Club fire: A fire at the Rhythm Night Club in Natchez, Mississippi kills 209.
 May 15
 The very first McDonald's restaurant opens in San Bernardino, California.
 Women's stockings made of nylon are first placed on sale across the U.S. Almost five million pairs are bought on this day.
 May 16 – U.S. President Franklin D. Roosevelt, addressing a joint session of Congress, asks for an extraordinary credit of approximately $900 million to finance construction of at least 50,000 airplanes per year.
 May 18 – The 6.9  El Centro earthquake affects California's Imperial Valley with a maximum Mercalli intensity of X (Extreme), causing nine deaths and twenty injuries. Financial losses are around $6 million. Significant damage also occurs in Mexicali, Mexico.
 May 25 – The Crypt of Civilization at Oglethorpe University is sealed.
 May 29 – The Vought XF4U-1, prototype of the F4U Corsair U.S. fighter later used in WWII, makes its first flight.
 June 10 – U.S. President Franklin D. Roosevelt denounces Italy's actions with his "Stab in the Back" speech during the graduation ceremonies of the University of Virginia.
 June 14 – U.S. President Franklin D. Roosevelt signs the Naval Expansion Act into law, which aims to increase the United States Navy's tonnage by 11%.
 June 16 – The Sturgis Motorcycle Rally is held for the first time in Sturgis, South Dakota.
 June 22 – The first Dairy Queen opens in Edina, Minnesota.
 June 24 – U.S. politics: The Republican Party begins its national convention in Philadelphia and nominates Wendell Willkie as its candidate for president.

July–September
 July 15 – U.S. politics: The Democratic Party begins its national convention in Chicago and nominates Franklin D. Roosevelt for an unprecedented third term as president.
 July 20 – The Arroyo Seco Parkway, one of the first freeways built in the U.S., opens to traffic, connecting downtown Los Angeles with Pasadena, California.
 July 27 – Bugs Bunny makes his debut in the Oscar-nominated cartoon short, A Wild Hare.
 August 4 – Gen. John J. Pershing, in a nationwide radio broadcast, urges all-out aid to Britain in order to defend the Americas, while Charles Lindbergh speaks to an isolationist rally at Soldier Field in Chicago.
September – The U.S. Army 45th Infantry Division (previously a National Guard Division in Arizona, Colorado, New Mexico and Oklahoma), is activated and ordered into federal service for 1 year, to engage in a training program in Ft. Sill and Louisiana, prior to serving in World War II.
 September 2 – WWII: An agreement between America and Great Britain is announced to the effect that 50 U.S. destroyers needed for escort work will be transferred to Great Britain. In return, America gains 99-year leases on British bases in the North Atlantic, West Indies and Bermuda.
 September 12 – The Hercules Munitions Plant in Succasunna-Kenvil, New Jersey explodes, killing 55 people.
 September 16 – WWII: The Selective Training and Service Act of 1940 is signed into law by Franklin D. Roosevelt, creating the first peacetime draft in U.S. history.
 September 26 – WWII: The United States imposes a total embargo on all scrap metal shipments to Japan.

October–December

 October 1 – The first section of the Pennsylvania Turnpike, the country's first long-distance controlled-access highway, is opened between Irwin and Carlisle.
 October 8 – The Cincinnati Reds defeat the Detroit Tigers, 4 games to 3, to win their 2nd World Series Title in baseball.
 October 16 – The draft registration of approximately 16 million men begins in the United States.
 October 29 – The Selective Service System lottery is held in Washington, D.C.
 November 5 – U.S. presidential election, 1940: Democratic incumbent Franklin D. Roosevelt defeats Republican challenger Wendell Willkie and becomes the nation's first and only third-term president.
 November 7 – In Tacoma, Washington, the Tacoma Narrows Bridge (nicknamed the "Galloping Gertie") collapses in a  wind storm, causing the center span of the bridge to sway. When it collapses, a  design of the center span falls 190 feet above the water, killing Tubby, a black male cocker spaniel dog.
 November 11 – Armistice Day Blizzard: An unexpected blizzard kills 144 in the Midwest.
 November 12 – Case of Hansberry v. Lee, decided, allowing a racially restrictive covenant to be lifted.
 November 13 – Walt Disney's third feature film, Fantasia, is released. It is the first box office failure for Disney, though it recoups its cost years later and becomes one of the most highly regarded of Disney's films.
 November 16 – An unexploded pipe bomb is found in the Consolidated Edison office building (only years later is the culprit, George Metesky, apprehended).
 December 8 – The Chicago Bears, in what will become the most one-sided victory in National Football League history, defeat the Washington Redskins 73–0 in the 1940 NFL Championship Game.
 December 17 – President Franklin D. Roosevelt, at his regular press conference, first sets forth the outline of his plan to send aid to Great Britain that will become known as Lend-Lease.
 December 20 – 1940 New Hampshire earthquakes: A 5.3  earthquake shakes New England with a maximum Mercalli intensity of VII (Very strong). This first event in a doublet earthquake is followed four days later by a 5.6  shock, but total damage from the events is light.
 December 21 – Writer F. Scott Fitzgerald (author of The Great Gatsby) dies of a heart attack aged 44 in the apartment of Hollywood gossip columnist Sheilah Graham, leaving his novel The Last Tycoon unfinished.
 December 29 – Franklin D. Roosevelt, in a fireside chat to the nation, declares that the United States must become "the great Arsenal of Democracy."
 December 30 – California's first modern freeway, the future State Route 110, opens to traffic in Pasadena, California, as the Arroyo Seco Parkway (later the Pasadena Freeway).

Undated
 Berk Trade and Business School is founded in New York City.
 Walter Knott begins construction of a California ghost town replica at Knott's Berry Farm.

Births

January 

 January 2 – Jim Bakker, televangelist, sometime husband of Tammy Faye
 January 4 – Helmut Jahn, German-American architect (d. 2021)
 January 6 – Penny Lernoux, journalist and author (d. 1989)
 January 13 – Edmund White, author
 January 14 – Julian Bond, African-American civil rights activist (d. 2015)
 January 15 – Arlie Russell Hochschild, professor emireta of sociology
 January 20 – Carol Heiss, figure skater
 January 21
 Jeremy Jacobs, businessman
 Jack Nicklaus, golfer
 January 23 – Jimmy Castor, African-American funk, R&B and soul saxophonist (d. 2012)
 January 27 – James Cromwell, actor
 January 28 – Al Strobel, actor (d. 2022)
 January 29 – Katharine Ross, actress
 January 31 – Stuart Margolin, actor

February 

 February 2 – Odell Brown, jazz organist (d. 2011)
 February 3 – Fran Tarkenton, American football player
 February 4 – George A. Romero, film writer and director (d. 2017)
 February 6 – Tom Brokaw, television news reporter
 February 8
 Ted Koppel, journalist
 Richard Lynch, actor (d. 2012)
 Joe South, country singer-songwriter
 Donald W. Stewart, politician
 February 12 – Hank Brown, politician
 February 14 – James Maynard, businessman, co-founded Golden Corral
 February 15 – John Hadl, American football player and coach
 February 17
 Chris Newman, sound mixer, director
 Gene Pitney, American pop singer (d. 2006)
 February 19 – Smokey Robinson, African-American musician
 February 21 – John Lewis, African-American politician, civil rights leader (d. 2020)
 February 22 – Billy Name, born William G. Linich, photographer and Warhol archivist
 February 23 – Peter Fonda, actor (d. 2019)
 February 24
 Pete Duel, actor (d. 1971)
 Jimmy Ellis, African-American professional boxer (d. 2014)
 February 25 – Ron Santo, baseball player (d. 2010)
 February 27 – Howard Hesseman, actor (d. 2022)
 February 28
 Mario Andretti, race car driver
 Joe South, singer-songwriter (d. 2012)

March 

 March 6 – Willie Stargell, African American baseball player (d. 2001)
 March 7 – Daniel J. Travanti, American actor 
 March 10
 Chuck Norris, American actor and martial artist
 Dean Torrence, American singer
 March 12 – Al Jarreau, African-American singer (d. 2017)
 March 13 – Candi Staton, American singer
 March 15 – Phil Lesh, American rock guitarist (Grateful Dead)
 March 17 – Mark White, American politician (d. 2017)
 March 18 – Mark Medoff, American playwright and screenwriter (d. 2019)
 March 20 – Mary Ellen Mark, American photographer (d. 2015)
 March 21 – Solomon Burke, African-American singer, songwriter (d. 2010)
 March 22 – Garland Boyette, American football player (d. 2022)
 March 25 – Anita Bryant, American entertainer
 March 26
 James Caan, American actor (d. 2022)
 Nancy Pelosi, American politician
 March 27 – Austin Pendleton, American actor, playwright, theatre director and instructor
 March 29 
 Thomas Cahill, American scholar and writer  (d. 2022)
 Ray Davis, American bass musician (P-Funk) (d. 2005)
 March 31
 Barney Frank, American politician
 Patrick Leahy, American politician

April 

 April 8 – John Havlicek, American basketball player (d. 2019)
 April 12
 John Hagee, American televangelist
 Herbie Hancock, African-American pianist, keyboardist, bandleader, composer and actor
 April 15 
 Willie Davis, American baseball player (d. 2010)
 Robert Walker, American actor (d. 2019)
 April 17 – Chuck Menville, American animator, writer (d. 1992)
 April 18 – Joseph L. Goldstein, American biochemist, recipient of the Nobel Prize in Physiology or Medicine
 April 20 – James Gammon, actor (d. 2010)  
 April 24
 Sue Grafton, detective novelist (d. 2017)
 Robert Knight, American singer (d. 2017)
 Michael Parks, American actor, singer (d. 2017)
 April 25 – Al Pacino, American actor and film director
 April 30 
 Robert Jervis, American political scientist (d. 2021)
 Burt Young, American actor, author and painter

May 

 May 1 – Allan M. Siegal, American newspaper editor and journalist (d. 2022)
 May 3 – David Koch, American billionaire businessman, philanthropist and political activist (d. 2019)
 May 5 
 Lance Henriksen, American actor
 Lucy Simon, American composer (d. 2022)
 May 7 – Kim Chernin, American feminist writer and poet (d. 2020)
 May 8
 Peter Benchley, American author (Jaws) (d. 2006)
 Emilio Delgado, American actor (Sesame Street), singer and activist (d. 2022)
 Ricky Nelson, American singer (d. 1985)
 Toni Tennille, American pop singer
 May 9 – James L. Brooks, American film producer, writer
 May 10 – Wayne A. Downing, American U.S. general (d. 2007)
 May 15 
 Lainie Kazan, American actress and singer
 Don Nelson, American basketball player and coach
 May 17 – Alan Kay, computer scientist
 May 18 – Lenny Lipton, inventor (d. 2022)
 May 20 – Shorty Long, African-American soul music singer, songwriter, musician and record producer (Here Comes The Judge) (d. 1969)
 May 22 – Bernard Shaw, African-American journalist and television news reporter (d. 2022)

June 

 June 1
 René Auberjonois, actor (d. 2019)
 Wayne Kemp, country singer-songwriter and guitarist (d. 2015)
 Kip Thorne, theoretical physicist and Nobel laureate
 June 3 – Connie Saylor, race car driver (d. 1993)
 June 7
 Samuel Little, serial killer (d. 2020)
 Evi Nemeth, author and engineer (d. 2013)
 June 8
 Arthur Elgort, photographer
 Nancy Sinatra, singer
 Jim Wickwire, lawyer and mountaineer
 June 9 –  Roger J. Phillips, geophysicist (d. 2020)
 June 11 – Wayne Kemp, country music singer (d. 2015)
 June 13 – Bobby Freeman, singer, songwriter (d. 2017)
 June 14 – Jack Bannon, actor (d. 2017)
 June 16
 Neil Goldschmidt, politician
 Thea White, actress (d. 2021)
 June 19 – Shirley Muldowney, race car driver
 June 21 – Mariette Hartley, actress
 June 23 – Wilma Rudolph, track & field athlete and 3-time Olympic winner (d. 1994)
 June 24 – Hope Cooke, socialite, Queen Consort of Sikkim
 June 26 – Lucinda Childs, actress, postmodern dancer and choreographer

July 

 July 2 – Joshua Bryant, American actor, director, author and speaker
 July 3
 Fontella Bass, African-American soul singer ("Rescue Me") (d. 2012)
 Lance Larson, American competition swimmer, Olympic champion, world record-holder in four events
 Chuck Sieminski, American football player (d. 2020)
 Lamar Alexander, American politician
 July 4 – Gene McDowell, American college football coach
 July 6 – Jeannie Seely, American singer, songwriter
 July 7 – Madeline Davis, American LGBT activist and historian (d. 2021)
 July 10
 Gene Alley, American baseball player
 Jim Cadile, American professional football offensive guard
 Helen Donath, American soprano
 Julie Payne, American actress (d. 2019)
 July 13 – Paul Prudhomme, Louisiana Creole cuisine American chef (d. 2015)
 July 15 – Johnny Seay, American country music singer (d. 2016)
 July 16 – Tom Metcalf, American baseball pitcher 
 July 17 – Verne Lundquist, American sportscaster
 July 18
 James Brolin, American actor, director
 Joe Torre, American baseball player, manager
 July 21 – Jim Clyburn, African-American politician
 July 23 – Don Imus, American radio personality (d. 2019)
 July 24
 Stanley Hauerwas, American theologian
 Dan Hedaya, American actor
 July 26
 Dobie Gray, African-American singer-songwriter (Drift Away) (d. 2011)
 Mary Jo Kopechne, American aide to Ted Kennedy (d. 1969)
 July 27 – Gary Kurtz, American filmmaker (d. 2018)
 July 28 – Philip Proctor, American actor
 July 29 – Bernard Lafayette, African-American civil rights activist

August 

 August 3 – Martin Sheen, actor
 August 7 – Thomas Barlow, politician (d. 2017)
 August 10 – Bobby Hatfield, singer (The Righteous Brothers) (d. 2003)
 August 13 – Tony Cloninger, baseball player (d. 2018)
 August 14 – Galen Hall, American football coach
 August 19 – Jill St. John, actress
 August 20 – Rubén Hinojosa, politician
 August 22 – Bill McCartney, American football player and coach, founded Promise Keepers
 August 23 – Thomas A. Steitz, biochemist (d. 2018)
 August 27 – Fernest Arceneaux, Zydeco accordionist (d. 2008)
 August 28 – William Cohen, politician
 August 29 
 James Brady, politician, 17th White House Press Secretary (d. 2014)
 Bennie Maupin, musician
 Johnny Paris, musician (Johnny and the Hurricanes) (d. 2006)
 August 31 – Wilton Felder, African American jazz saxophonist (d. 2015)

September 

 September 3 – Joseph C. Strasser, American admiral (d. 2019)
 September 5 – Raquel Welch, American actress (d. 2023)
 September 10 – David Mann, American artist (d. 2004)
 September 11 
 Brian De Palma, film director
 Thomas K. McCraw, historian and author (d. 2012)
 Theodore Olson, lawyer and politician, United States Solicitor General
 Robert Palmer, businessman, co-founded Mostek
 September 12
 Linda Gray, American model and screen actress
 Skip Hinnant, American film actor and comedian
 Mickey Lolich, American baseball player
 Stephen J. Solarz, American academic and politician (d. 2010)
 September 14 – Larry Brown, American basketball player and coach
 September 15 – Merlin Olsen, American football player, announcer and actor (d. 2010)
 September 18 – Frankie Avalon, American pop singer and actor
 September 22 – Mike Schuler, American basketball coach (d. 2022)

October 

 October 1 – Richard Corben, American illustrator and comic book artist (d. 2020)
 October 3 – Alan O'Day, American singer, songwriter (d. 2013)
 October 6 – Wyche Fowler, American politician
 October 7 – Bruce Vento, American educator and politician (d. 2000)
 October 9 
 Gordon J. Humphrey, American politician
 Joe Pepitone, American baseball player and coach (d. 2023)
 October 13 – Pharoah Sanders, American saxophonist (d. 2022)
 October 16 – Barry Corbin, American actor
 October 20 – Robert Pinsky, American poet, essayist, literary critic and translator
 October 25 – Bob Knight, American basketball player and coach
 October 27 – John Gotti, American gangster (d. 2002)
 October 29 – Connie Mack III, American politician

November 

 November 11 – Barbara Boxer, American politician
 November 12 – Donald Wuerl, American archbishop
 November 15 – Sam Waterston, American actor
 November 21 – Richard Marcinko, U.S. Navy SEAL team member, author
 November 22 – Terry Gilliam, American-born British screenwriter, director and animator
 November 23 
 Frazier Glenn Miller Jr., American domestic terrorist (d. 2021)
 Rockin' Robin Roberts, American rock and roll singer (d. 1967)
 November 25
 Joe Gibbs, American football coach and NASCAR Xfinity Series team owner
 Percy Sledge, African-American singer (d. 2015)
 November 27 – Bruce Lee, Chinese-American martial artist, actor (d. 1973)
 November 29 – Chuck Mangione, American flugelhorn player

December 

 December 1 – Richard Pryor, African-American actor, comedian (d. 2005)
 December 4
 Freddy Cannon, American singer
 Gary Gilmore, American murderer (d. 1977)
 December 11
 David Gates, American singer-songwriter
 Donna Mills, American actress
 December 12 
 Shirley Englehorn, American golfer (d. 2022)
 Dionne Warwick, African-American singer and actress
 December 19 – Phil Ochs, American singer and songwriter (d. 1976)
 December 21
 Kelly Cherry, American poet and author
 Frank Zappa, American musician, songwriter, composer, guitarist, record producer, actor and filmmaker (d. 1993)
 December 23 – Jorma Kaukonen, American musician (Jefferson Airplane) 
December 24
 Janet Carroll, American actress, singer (d. 2012)
 Anthony Fauci, American Immunologist
 December 26 – Edward C. Prescott, American economist, Nobel Prize laureate
 December 29 – Fred Hansen, American Olympic athlete
 December 31 – Tim Considine, American actor (d. 2022)

Deaths

January–June
 January 4 – Flora Finch, silent film actress and comedian (born 1869 in the United Kingdom)
 January 19 – William Borah, U.S. Senator from Idaho from 1907 to 1940 (born 1865) 
 January 20 – Omar Bundy, U.S. Army General (born 1861)
 January – Matilda McCrear, last survivor of the transatlantic slave trade in the U.S. (born c. 1857 in Yorubaland)
 February 1 – Philip Francis Nowlan, science fiction writer, creator of Buck Rogers (born 1888)
 February 4 – Samuel M. Vauclain, steam locomotive engineer (born 1856)
 February 9 – William Edward Dodd, diplomat and historian (born 1869)
 February 11 – Ellen Day Hale, painter and printmaker (born 1855)
 March 4 – Hamlin Garland, writer (born 1860)
 March 7 – Edwin Markham, poet (born 1852)
 March 11 – John Monk Saunders, screenwriter (born 1897)
 March 27 – Madeleine Talmage (Force) Astor Dick Fiermonte, socialite, survivor of the sinking of the Titanic, widow of John Jacob Astor IV (born 1893)
 April 8 –  David C. Shanks, army officer (born 1861)
 April 29 – Edgar Buckingham, physicist and soil scientist (born 1867)
 May 28 – Walter Connolly, film character actor (born 1887)
 May 29 – Mary Anderson, stage actress (born 1859)
 June 7
 James Hall, film actor (born 1900)
 Hugh Rodman, U.S. Navy admiral (born 1859)
 June 11 – Alfred S. Alschuler, Chicago architect (born 1876)
 June 13 – George Fitzmaurice, film director (born 1885 in France)
 June 14 – Henry W. Antheil Jr., diplomat, killed in shootdown of airplane Kaleva (born 1912)
 June 20 – Charley Chase, comedian (born 1893)
 June 21 – John T. Thompson, U.S. Army officer, inventor of the Thompson submachine gun (born 1860)

July–December
 July 1 – Ben Turpin, comic silent film actor (born 1869)
 July 15 – Robert Wadlow, tallest man ever (born 1918)
 July 30 – Spencer S. Wood, U.S. Navy rear admiral (born 1861)
 August 5 – Frederick Cook, explorer (born 1865)
 August 8 – Johnny Dodds, jazz clarinetist (born 1892)
 August 18 – Walter Chrysler, automobile pioneer (born 1875)
 August 21 – Ernest Thayer, writer, comic poet (born 1863)
 August 22 – Mary Vaux Walcott, botanical artist (born 1860)
 August 28 – William Bowie, geodetic engineer (born 1872)
 August 31 – Ernest Lundeen, lawyer and politician (born 1878)
 September 1 – Lillian Wald, nurse and humanitarian (born 1867)
 September 2 – Eddie Collins, vaudeville-veteran comic (born 1883)
 September 6 – Leonor F. Loree, civil engineer and railroad executive (born 1858)
 September 23 – Hale Holden, president of Chicago, Burlington and Quincy Railroad (born 1869)
 September 25 – Marguerite Clark, stage and silent film actress (born 1883)
 September 28 – Earl Hurd, animator, film director and comics artist (born 1880)
 October 5 – Ballington Booth, co-founder of Volunteers of America (born 1857)
 October 11 – Charles Stanton Ogle, actor (born 1865)
 October 12 – Tom Mix, Western film actor (born 1880)
 October 17 – George Davis, baseball player (born 1870)
 November 5 – Otto Plath, entomologist, father of poet Sylvia Plath (born 1885 in Germany)
 November 9 – John Henry Kirby, Texas legislator and businessman (born 1860)
 November 17
 Ralph W. Barnes, journalist (born 1899)
 Raymond Pearl, biologist (born 1879)
 November 18 – Sylvia Ashton, silent film actress (born 1880)
 December 10 – William V. Mong, film actor, screenwriter and director (born 1875)
 December 15 – Billy Hamilton, baseball player (born 1866)
 December 21 – F. Scott Fitzgerald, fiction writer (born 1896)
 December 22 – Nathanael West, fiction writer, in automobile accident (born 1903)
 December 23 – Eddie August Schneider, aviator, in airplane crash (born 1911)
 December 25 – Agnes Ayres, silent film actress (born 1891)
 December 26 – Daniel Frohman, theater producer (born 1851)
 December 27 – Ella Rhoads Higginson, poet (born 1862)
 December 30 – C. Harold Wills, automobile engineer and businessman (born 1878)
 December 31 – Roberta Lawson, Indigenous American (Lenape) activist and musician (born 1878)

See also
 List of American films of 1940
 Timeline of United States history (1930–1949)

References

Further reading
 Bloch, Leon Bryce and Lamar Middleton, ed. The World Over in 1940 (1941) detailed coverage of world events online free; 914pp

External links
 

 
1940s in the United States
United States
United States
Years of the 20th century in the United States